Dhamial is a village of Rawalpindi District in the Punjab province of Pakistan. It is located at 33.33°N 73.1°E with an altitude of 492 metres (1617 feet). The area gets its name from the Rajput cast ‘Dhamial Rajputs’ before the separation of Pakistan in 1947.

References

Populated places in Rawalpindi District